John Richard Keating (February 12, 1908 — November 14, 1984) was a Canadian professional ice hockey player who played 35 games in the National Hockey League with the New York Americans between the 1931–32 and 1932–33 seasons. The rest of his career, which lasted from 1930 to 1947, was spent in the minor leagues. Keating was born in Saint John, New Brunswick.

Career statistics

Regular season and playoffs

External links
 

1908 births
1984 deaths
Buffalo Bisons (AHL) players
Buffalo Bisons (IHL) players
Canadian ice hockey left wingers
Ice hockey people from New Brunswick
New Haven Eagles players
New York Americans players
Providence Reds players
St. Paul Saints (AHA) players
Sportspeople from Saint John, New Brunswick
Syracuse Stars (IHL) players